In music, Op. 166 stands for Opus number 166. Compositions that are assigned this number include:

 Rheinberger – Suite for Violin and Organ
 Saint-Saëns – Oboe Sonata
 Strauss – Frauenherz